Kelburn is a central suburb of Wellington, the capital city of New Zealand, situated within  of the central business district.

Kelburn sits on the hills just west of the capital's central business district and is bordered by the Botanic Garden and the suburbs of Thorndon and Northland to the north, the suburbs of Karori and Highbury to the south west, and Aro Valley to the south.

Features

The iconic Wellington Cable Car is a tourist attraction and public transport facility. Operating since 1902, it is a funicular railway that ascends from Lambton Quay in the central business district to Kelburn. The Wellington Cable Car Museum is next to its Kelburn terminus.

The Wellington Botanic Garden comprises 25 hectares of native forest, gardens and displays, and has entrances adjacent to the Kelburn terminus of the cable car and on Kelburn's Glen Road.

The main campus of Victoria University of Wellington is in Kelburn, and is home to the category 1 listed Hunter Building, the Adam Art Gallery and the Adam Concert Room. It includes Te Tumu Herenga Waka Marae, a tribal meeting place of the Ngāti Awa hapū of Ngāti Awa ki Poneke.

The Carter Observatory includes a planetarium and exhibition, and is located within the Botanic Garden, close to the Kelburn terminus of the cable car. The cable car also has a university stop next to Kelburn Park, which serves as a university and community sports ground.

Kelburn Village, on Upland Road, houses cafes, restaurants, a pub and local shops. Several embassies and consulates are based in Kelburn, notably the Embassy of the Republic of Indonesia on Glen Road. The headquarters of Metservice, New Zealand's national meteorological service, is located in the Botanic Garden in Kelburn.

The Kelburn Viaduct was one of New Zealand's earliest reinforced concrete bridges, and provides vehicle and foot access to Karori and other Western suburbs.

History
The suburb of 'Kelburne' was established after the Upland Estate Company purchased farmland from William Moxham in 1896. It was named after Viscount Kelburne, son of the Governor of New Zealand at the time. The 'e' at the end of 'Kelburne' was later omitted to avoid confusion with the suburb of Kilbirnie.

In 1898, the investors formed a company to build and operate the cable car, to distinguish the nascent suburb from competing residential developments. Kelburn was populated quickly following the opening of the cable car in 1902, with Victoria University's Hunter Building opening in 1904, the Dominion Observatory in 1907, construction of St Michael's Church in 1912, and of Kelburn Normal School in 1914.

Demographics

Kelburn had a population of 4,770 at the 2018 New Zealand census, an increase of 189 people (4.1%) since the 2013 census, and an increase of 483 people (11.3%) since the 2006 census. There were 1,434 households. There were 2,250 males and 2,523 females, giving a sex ratio of 0.89 males per female, with 390 people (8.2%) aged under 15 years, 2,574 (54.0%) aged 15 to 29, 1,383 (29.0%) aged 30 to 64, and 432 (9.1%) aged 65 or older.

Ethnicities were 87.9% European/Pākehā, 7.2% Māori, 1.9% Pacific peoples, 9.1% Asian, and 3.0% other ethnicities (totals add to more than 100% since people could identify with multiple ethnicities).

The proportion of people born overseas was 28.7%, compared with 27.1% nationally.

Although some people objected to giving their religion, 62.5% had no religion, 26.1% were Christian, 0.6% were Hindu, 0.9% were Muslim, 0.8% were Buddhist and 4.3% had other religions.

Of those at least 15 years old, 2,034 (46.4%) people had a bachelor or higher degree, and 78 (1.8%) people had no formal qualifications. The employment status of those at least 15 was that 1,827 (41.7%) people were employed full-time, 915 (20.9%) were part-time, and 342 (7.8%) were unemployed.

Homes in the suburb are among the city's most valuable. As well as homeowners, residents of Kelburn include undergraduate and postgraduate students seeking to live in the vicinity of Victoria University.

Education

The decile 10 school was founded in 1914 as a school for educating primary school teachers, and has a specialist music programme.

Kelburn is within the enrolment zones for Wellington College, Wellington Girls' College and Wellington High School.

Climate

Boundaries

Kelburn's boundaries form an approximate triangle, with the Terrace Tunnel and State Highway 1 defining the eastern boundary, Bowen Street (west of State Highway 1) and Glenmore Street defining the northwestern boundary, and the hills above Aro Valley forming the southern boundary.

Notable people
The northern area of Kelburn near Parliament Buildings and between the Botanic Garden and Kelburn Park has been home to the Todd family, one of New Zealand's wealthiest families. Business leaders Sir Ron Trotter and Lloyd Morrison and prominent lawyers including Sir Kenneth Keith and Sir John McGrath lived in Kelburn. Prominent residents have also included politicians and public figures such as Sir Keith Holyoake and Sir Guy Powles.

Further reading

References

Suburbs of Wellington City